Rodney Rice may refer to:
 Rodney Rice (American football)
 Rodney Rice (broadcaster)